The Ford GT40 is a high-performance endurance racing car designed and built by the Ford Motor Company. It grew out of the "Ford GT" (for Grand Touring) project, an effort to compete in European long-distance sports car races, against Ferrari, who had won the prestigious 24 Hours of Le Mans race from 1960 to 1965. Ford succeeded with the GT40, winning the 1966 through 1969 races.

The effort began in the early 1960s when Ford Advanced Vehicles began to build the GT40 Mk I, based upon the Lola Mk6, at their base in Slough, UK. After disappointing race results, the engineering team was moved in 1964 to Dearborn, Michigan (Kar Kraft). The range was powered by a series of American-built Ford V8 engines modified for racing.

In 1966, the GT40 Mk II broke Ferrari's streak at Le Mans, notching the first win for an American manufacturer in a major European race since Jimmy Murphy's triumph with Duesenberg at the 1921 French Grand Prix. In 1967, the Mk IV became the only car designed and built entirely in the United States to achieve the overall win at Le Mans.

The Mk I, the oldest of the cars, won in 1968 and 1969, the second chassis to win Le Mans more than once. (This Ford/Shelby chassis, #P-1075, was believed to have been the first until the Ferrari 275P chassis 0816 was revealed to have won the 1964 race after winning the 1963 race in 250P configuration and with a 0814 chassis plate). Its American Ford V8 engine, originally of 4.7-liter displacement capacity (289 cubic inches), was enlarged to 4.9 liters (302 cubic inches), with custom alloy Gurney–Weslake cylinder heads.

The "40" represented its height of 40 inches (1.02 m), measured at the windshield, the minimum allowed. The first 12 "prototype" vehicles carried serial numbers GT-101 to GT-112. Once "production" began, the Mk I, Mk II, Mk III, and Mk IV were numbered GT40P/1000 through GT40P/1145, and thus officially "GT40s". The Mk IVs were numbered J1-J12.

The contemporary Ford GT is a modern homage to the GT40.

History 
Henry Ford II had wanted a Ford at Le Mans since the early 1960s. In early 1963, Ford reportedly received word through a European intermediary that Enzo Ferrari was interested in selling to Ford Motor Company. Ford reportedly spent several million dollars in an audit of Ferrari factory assets and in legal negotiations, only to have Ferrari unilaterally cut off talks at a late stage due to disputes about the ability to direct open-wheel racing. Ferrari, who wanted to remain the sole operator of his company's motorsports division, was angered when he was told that he would not be allowed to race at the Indianapolis 500 if the deal went through, since Ford fielded Indy cars using its own engine and didn't want competition from Ferrari. Enzo cut the deal off out of spite and Henry Ford II, enraged, directed his racing division to find a company that could build a Ferrari-beater on the world endurance-racing circuit.

To this end, Ford began negotiation with Lotus, Lola, and Cooper. Cooper had no experience in GT or prototype and its performances in Formula One were declining.

The Lola proposal was chosen since Lola had used a Ford V8 engine in its mid-engined Lola Mk6 (also known as Lola GT). It was one of the most advanced racing cars of the time and made a noted performance in Le Mans 1963, even though the car did not finish, due to low gearing and slow revving out on the Mulsanne Straight. However, Eric Broadley, Lola Cars' owner and chief designer, agreed on a short-term personal contribution to the project without involving Lola Cars.

The agreement with Broadley included a one-year collaboration between Ford and Broadley, and the sale of the two Lola Mk 6 chassis builds to Ford. To form the development team, Ford also hired the ex-Aston Martin team manager John Wyer. Ford Motor Co. engineer Roy Lunn was sent to England; he had designed the mid-engined Mustang I concept car powered by a 1.7-liter V4. Despite the small engine of the Mustang I, Lunn was the only Dearborn engineer to have some experience with a mid-engined car.

Overseen by Harley Copp, the team of Broadley, Lunn, and Wyer began working on the new car at the Lola Factory in Bromley. At the end of 1963, the team moved to Slough, near Heathrow Airport. Ford then established Ford Advanced Vehicles (FAV) Ltd, a new subsidiary under the direction of Wyer, to manage the project.

The first chassis built by Abbey Panels of Coventry was delivered on 16 March 1964, with fiber-glass moldings produced by Fibre Glass Engineering Ltd of Farnham. The first "Ford GT" the GT/101 was unveiled in England on 1 April and soon after exhibited in New York. Purchase price of the completed car for competition use was £5,200.

It was powered by the 4.7 L 289 cu in Fairlane engine with a Colotti transaxle.  An aluminium block DOHC version, known as the Ford Indy Engine, was used in later years at Indy. It won in 1965 in the Lotus 38.

Racing history 

The Ford GT40 was first raced in May 1964 at the Nürburgring 1000 km race where it retired with suspension failure after holding second place early in the event. Three weeks later at the 24 Hours of Le Mans, all three entries retired, although the Ginther/Gregory car led the field from the second lap until its first pitstop. After a season-long series of dismal results under John Wyer in 1964, the program was handed over to Carroll Shelby after the 1964 Nassau race. The cars were sent directly to Shelby, still bearing the dirt and damage from the Nassau race. Carroll Shelby was noted for complaining that the cars were poorly maintained when he received them, but later information revealed the cars were packed up as soon as the race was over, and FAV never had a chance to clean and organize the cars to be transported to Shelby.

Shelby's first victory came on their maiden race with the Ford program, with Ken Miles and Lloyd Ruby taking a Shelby American-entered Ford GT40  to victory in the Daytona 2000km in February 1965. One month later, Ken Miles and Bruce McLaren came in second overall (to the winning Chaparral in the sports class) and first in prototype class at the Sebring 12-hour race. The rest of the season, however, was a disappointment.

The experience gained in 1964 and 1965 allowed the 7-liter Mk II to dominate the following year. In February, the GT40 again won at Daytona. This was the first year Daytona was run in the 24 Hour format and Mk II's finished 1st, 2nd, and 3rd. In March, at the 1966 12 Hours of Sebring, GT40s again took all three top finishes, with the X-1 Roadster first, a Mk II taking second, and a Mk I in third. Then in June, at the 24 Hours of Le Mans, the GT40 achieved yet another 1–2–3 result.

The Le Mans finish, however, was clouded in controversy: The No1 car of Ken Miles and Denny Hulme held a four lap lead over the No2 car of Bruce McLaren and Chris Amon. This disintegrated when the No1 car was forced to make a pit-stop for replacement brake rotors, following an incorrect set being fitted a lap prior in a scheduled rotor change. It was found to be a result of the correct brake rotors being taken by the No2 crew. This meant that in the final few hours, the Ford GT40 of New Zealanders Bruce McLaren and Chris Amon closely trailed the leading Ford GT40 driven by Englishman Ken Miles and New Zealander Denny Hulme. With a multimillion-dollar program finally on the very brink of success, Ford team officials faced a difficult choice. They could allow the drivers to settle the outcome by racing each other—and risk one or both cars breaking down or crashing; they could dictate a finishing order to the drivers—guaranteeing that one set of drivers would be extremely unhappy; or they could arrange a tie, with the McLaren/Amon and Miles/Hulme cars crossing the line side by side.

The team chose the latter and informed Shelby.  He told McLaren and Miles of the decision just before the two got into their cars for the final stint. Then, not long before the finish, the Automobile Club de l'Ouest (ACO), organizers of the Le Mans event, informed Ford that the geographical difference in starting positions would be taken into account at a close finish. This meant that the McLaren/Amon vehicle, which had started perhaps  behind the Hulme-Miles car, would have covered slightly more ground over the 24 hours and would, in the event of a tie for first place, be the winner. Secondly, Ford officials admitted later, the company's contentious relationship with Miles, its top contract driver, placed executives in a difficult position. They could reward an outstanding driver who had been at times extremely difficult to work with, or they could decide in favor of drivers (McLaren/Amon) who had committed less to the Ford program but who had been easier to deal with. Ford stuck with the orchestrated photo finish. What happened on the last lap remains the subject of speculation. Either Miles, deeply bitter over this decision after his dedication to the program, issued his own protest by suddenly slowing just yards from the finish and letting McLaren across the line first, or McLaren accelerated just before the finish line robbing Miles of his victory. Either way, McLaren was declared the victor. Miles died in a testing accident in the J-car (later to become the Mk IV) at Riverside (CA) Raceway just two months later.

Miles' death occurred at the wheel of the Ford "J-car", an iteration of the GT40 that included several unique features. These included an aluminum honeycomb chassis construction and a "bread van" body design that experimented with "Kammback" aerodynamic theories. Unfortunately, the fatal Miles accident was attributed at least partly to the unproven aerodynamics of the J-car design, as well as the experimental chassis' strength. The team embarked on a complete redesign of the car, which became known as the Mk IV. The Mk IV newer design, with a Mk II engine but a different chassis and a different body, won the following year at Le Mans (when four Mark IVs, three Mark IIs, and three Mark Is raced). The high speeds achieved in that race caused a rule change, which already came into effect in 1968: the prototypes were limited to the capacity of 3.0 liters, the same as in Formula One. This took out the V12-powered Ferrari 330P as well as the Chaparral and the Mk  IV.

If at least 50 cars had been built, sportscars like the GT40 and the Lola T70 were allowed, with a maximum of 5.0  L. John Wyer's revised 4.7-liter (bored to 4.9 liter, and O-rings cut and installed between the block and head to prevent head gasket failure, a common problem found with the 4.7 engine) Mk I won the 24 hours of Le Mans race in 1968 against the fragile smaller prototypes. This result, added to four other round wins for the GT40, gave Ford victory in the 1968 International Championship for Makes. The GT40's intended 3.0  L replacement, the Ford P68, and Mirage cars proved a dismal failure. While facing more experienced prototypes and the new yet still unreliable 4.5  L flat-12-powered Porsche 917s, Wyer's 1969 24 Hours of Le Mans winners Jacky Ickx/Jackie Oliver managed to beat the remaining 3.0-liter Porsche 908 by just a few seconds with the already outdated GT40 Mk I, in the very car that had won in 1968—the legendary GT40P/1075. Apart from brake wear in the Porsche and the decision not to change brake pads so close to the race end, the winning combination was relaxed driving by both GT40 drivers and heroic efforts at the right time by (at that time Le Mans' rookie) Ickx, who won Le Mans five more times in later years.

Le Mans 24 Hours victories

International titles 
In addition to four consecutive overall Le Mans victories, Ford also won the following four FIA international titles (at what was then unofficially known as the World Sportscar Championship) with the GT40:

 1966 International Manufacturers Championship – Over 2000cc
 1966 International Championship for Sports Cars – Division III (Over 2000cc)
 1967 International Championship for Sports Cars – Division III (Over 2000cc)
 1968 International Championship for Makes

Versions

Mk I 

The Mk I was the original Ford GT40. Early prototypes were powered by 255 cu in (4.2 L) alloy V8 engines  and production models were powered by  engines as used in the Ford Mustang. Five prototype models were built with roadster bodywork, including the Ford X-1. Two lightweight cars (of a planned five), AMGT40/1 and AMGT40/2, were built by Alan Mann Racing in 1966, with light alloy bodies and other weight-saving modifications.

The Mk I met with little success in its initial tune for the 1964 and 1965 Le Mans races. The first success came after their demise at the Nassau Speed Weekend Nov 1964 when the racing was handed over to Carrol Shelby. Shelby's team modified the Ford GT40 and the first win at Daytona February 1965 was achieved. Much was later modified and run by John Wyer in 1968 and 1969, winning Le Mans in both those years and Sebring in 1969. The Mk II and IV were both obsolete after the FIA had changed the rules to ban unlimited capacity engines, ruling out the 427 cu in (7 L) Ford V8. However, the Mk I, with its smaller engine, was legally able to race as a homologated sports car because of its production numbers.

In 1968 competition came from the Porsche 908 which was the first prototype built for the 3-liter Group 6. The result of the 1968 was resounding success at the 24 Hours of Le Mans with Pedro Rodríguez and Lucien Bianchi having a clear lead over the Porsches, driving the ‘almighty’ #9 car with the 'Gulf Oil' colors.<ref>{{cite web
|url=https://primotipo.com/tag/ford-gt40-1076/
|title=Posts Tagged 'Ford GT40 '1076|website=Primotipo.com
|editor=GP Library
|first=Rainer
|last=Schlegelmilch
|date=May 9, 2016
|access-date=2018-09-08}}</ref> The season began slowly for JW, losing at Sebring and Daytona before taking their first win at the BOAC International 500 at Brands Hatch. Later victories included the Grand Prix de Spa, 21st Annual Watkins Glen Sports Car Road Race and the 1000 km di Monza.

31 Mk I cars were built at the Slough factory in "road" trim, which differed little from the race versions. Wire wheels, carpet, ruched fabric map pockets in the doors and a cigarette lighter made up most of the changes. Some cars deleted the ventilated seats, and at least one (chassis 1049) was built with the opening, metal-framed, windows from the Mk III.

 X-1 Roadster
The X-1 was a roadster built to contest the Fall 1965 North American Pro Series, a forerunner of Can-Am, entered by the Bruce McLaren team and driven by Chris Amon. The car had an aluminum chassis built at Abbey Panels and was originally powered by a 289 cu in (4.7L) engine. The real purpose of this car was to test several improvements originating from Kar Kraft, Shelby, and McLaren. Several gearboxes were used: a Hewland LG500 and at least one automatic gearbox. It was later upgraded to Mk II specifications with a 427 cu in (7 L) engine and a standard four ratio Kar Kraft (subsidiary of Ford) gearbox, however, the car kept specific features such as its open roof and lightweight aluminum chassis. The car went on to win the 12 Hours of Sebring in 1966. The X-1 was a one-off and having been built in the United Kingdom and being liable for United States tariffs, was later ordered to be destroyed by United States customs officials.

 Mk II 

The Mk II was rebuilt separately by both Holman Moody and Shelby American to handle the 7.0-liter FE (427 ci) engine from the Ford Galaxie, used in NASCAR at the time and modified for road course use. The car's chassis was similar to the British-built Mk I chassis, but it and other parts of the car had to be redesigned and modified by Holman Moody to accommodate the larger and heavier 427 engine. A new Kar Kraft-built four-speed gearbox replaced the ZF five-speed used in the Mk I. This car is sometimes called the Ford Mk II.

In 1966, the three teams racing the Mk II (Chris Amon and Bruce McLaren, Denny Hulme and Ken Miles, and Dick Hutcherson and Ronnie Bucknum) dominated Le Mans, taking European audiences by surprise and beating Ferrari to finish 1-2-3 in the standings. The Ford GT40 went on to win the race for the next three years.

For 1967, the Mk IIs were upgraded to "B" spec; they had re-designed bodywork and twin Holley carburetors for an additional . A batch of improperly heat-treated input shafts in the transaxles sidelined virtually every Ford in the race at Daytona, however, and Ferrari won 1-2-3. The Mk IIBs were also used for Sebring and Le Mans that year and won the Reims 12 Hours in France. For the Daytona 24 Hours, two Mk II models (chassis 1016 and 1047) had their engines re-badged as Mercury engines; Ford seeing a good opportunity to advertise that division of the company.

In 2018, a Mk II that was 3rd overall at the 1966 Le Mans 24 Hours was sold by RM Sotheby's for $9,795,000 (£7,624,344) - the highest price achieved for a GT40 at auction.

 Mk III 

The Mk III was a road-car only, of which seven were built. As the Mk III looked significantly different from the racing models many customers interested in buying a GT40 for road use chose to buy a Mk I that was available from Wyer Ltd. Of the seven MK III that were produced four were left-hand drive.

 J-car 

In an effort to develop a car with better aerodynamics (potentially resulting in superior control and speed compared to competitors), the decision was made to re-conceptualize and  redesign everything about the vehicle other than its powerful 7-liter engine. This would result in the abandonment of the original Mk I/Mk II chassis.

In order to bring the car into alignment with Ford's "in house" ideology at the time, more restrictive partnerships were implemented with English firms, which resulted in the sale of Ford Advanced Vehicles (acquired by John Wyer), ultimately leading to a new vehicle which would be slated for design by Ford's studios and produced by Ford's subsidiary Kar-Kraft under Ed Hull. Furthermore, there was also a partnership with the Brunswick Aircraft Corporation for expertise on the novel use of aluminum honeycomb panels bonded together to form a lightweight, rigid "tub".

The car was designated as the J-car, as it was constructed to meet the new Appendix J regulations 
which were introduced by the FIA in 1966.

The first J-car was completed in March 1966 and set the fastest time at the Le Mans trials that year. The tub weighed only , and the entire car weighed only ,  less than the Mk II. It was decided to run the Mk IIs due to their proven reliability, however, and little or no development was done on the J-car for the rest of the season. Following Le Mans, the development program for the J-car was resumed, and a second car was built. During a test session at Riverside International Raceway in August 1966 with Ken Miles driving, the car suddenly went out of control at the end of Riverside's high-speed,  back straight. The aluminum honeycomb chassis did not live up to its design goal, shattering upon impact. The car burst into flames, killing Miles. It was determined that the unique, flat-topped "bread van" aerodynamics of the car, lacking any sort of spoiler, were implicated in generating excess lift. Therefore, a conventional but significantly more aerodynamic body was designed for the subsequent development of the J-car which was officially known as the Mk IV. A total of nine cars were constructed with J-car chassis numbers although six were designated as Mk IVs and one as the G7A.

 Mk IV 

The Mk IV was built around a reinforced J chassis powered by the same 7.0 L engine as the Mk II. Excluding the engine, gearbox, some suspension parts and the brakes from the Mk II, the Mk IV was totally different from other GT40s, using a specific, all-new chassis and bodywork. It was undoubtedly the most radical and American variant of all the GT40s over the years. As a direct result of the Miles accident, the team installed a NASCAR-style steel-tube roll cage in the Mk IV, which made it much safer, but the roll cage was so heavy that it negated most of the weight saving of the then-highly advanced, radically innovative honeycomb-panel construction. The Mk IV had a long, streamlined shape, which gave it exceptional top speed, crucial to do well at Le Mans in those days (a circuit made up predominantly of straights)—the race it was ultimately built for. A 2-speed automatic gearbox was tried, but during the extensive testing of the J-car in 1966 and 1967, it was decided that the 4-speed from the Mk II would be retained. Dan Gurney often complained about the weight of the Mk IV, since the car was  heavier than the Ferrari 330 P4's. During practice at Le Mans in 1967, in an effort to preserve the highly stressed brakes, Gurney developed a strategy (also adopted by co-driver A.J. Foyt) of backing completely off the throttle several hundred yards before the approach to the Mulsanne hairpin and virtually coasting into the braking area. This technique saved the brakes, but the resulting increase in the car's recorded lap times during practice led to speculation within the Ford team that Gurney and Foyt, in an effort to compromise on chassis settings, had hopelessly "dialed out" their car. The car proved to be fastest in a straight line that year, thanks to its streamlined aerodynamics, achieving 212 mph on the 3.6-mile Mulsanne Straight. Gurney, who was 6 feet 4 inches tall also requested a bubble-shaped piece of spherical bodywork extension over the top of the driver's seat so that he could fit into the car. 

Ford’s R&D department in Detroit had built a test rig that simulated whatever circuit the rig’s computer was programmed to simulate; the Mk IV was put on this test rig and was subjected to weeks and weeks of testing on a simulated Le Mans lap. The rig was programmed to know every detail of the programmed circuit- every bump, every contour, every gear change, every corner and every length of straight on the Le Mans circuit, so that the engineers running these tests would know exactly how to build and prepare every component of the car for Le Mans. These kinds of test rigs are commonly used today by Formula One and factory Le Mans prototype teams; however this kind of incredibly advanced technology for the time, which was developed throughout 1966 and early 1967 was unheard of.

The Mk IV ran in only two races, the 1967 12 Hours of Sebring and the 1967 24 Hours of Le Mans and won both events. Only one Mk IV was completed for Sebring; the pressure from Ford had been amped up considerably after Ford's humiliation at Daytona two months earlier. Mario Andretti and Bruce McLaren won Sebring, Dan Gurney and A. J. Foyt won Le Mans (Gurney and Foyt's car was the Mk IV that was apparently least likely to win), where the Ford-representing Shelby-American and Holman & Moody teams showed up to Le Mans with 2 Mk IVs each. The installation of the roll cage was ultimately credited by many with saving the life of Andretti, who crashed violently at the Esses during the 1967 Le Mans 24 Hours, but escaped with minor injuries. Gurney later described the Mk IV as "half-way between a road-legal passenger car and a race car; it was reliable and comfortable, but heavy".

Unlike the earlier Mk I - III cars, the chassis of which were built in Britain, the Mk IVs were built entirely in America by Kar Kraft, Ford's performance division in Detroit. Le Mans 1967 remains the only all-American victory in Le Mans history—American drivers, team, chassis, engine, and tires. A total of six Mk IVs were constructed. One of the Mk IVs was rebuilt to the Ford G7 in 1968, and used in the Can-Am series for 1969 and 1970, but with no success. This car is sometimes called the Ford Mk IV.

Mk V and John Wyer's modified Mk I's
For years Peter Thorp had searched for a GT40 in good condition. Most of the cars had problems including the dreaded rust issue. His company, Safir Engineering, was building and fielding Formula 3 race cars, in addition, had a Token Formula One car purchased from the Ron Dennis Company, Rondell Racing. Formula One events in which Safir Engineering competed included Brands Hatch and Silverstone. Safir was also redesigning Range Rovers modifying the unit to six-wheel drive and exporting them. Safir technical capabilities were such that they could rebuild GT40s. It was with this in mind that Thorp approached John Willment for his thoughts. It was soon decided that there would be a limited, further run of the significant GT40. JW Engineering would oversee the build, and Safir was to do the work. The continued JW Engineering/Safir Engineering production would utilize sequential serial numbers starting at the last used GT40 serial number and move forward. Maintaining the GT40 Mark nomenclature, this continued production would be named GT40 Mk V.

JW Engineering wished to complete the GT40 chassis numbers GT40P-1087, 1088 and 1089. This was supposed to take place prior to the beginning of Safir production, however, the completion of these three chassis’ was very much delayed.

Ford's Len Bailey was hired to inspect the proposed build and engineer any changes he thought prudent to ensure the car was safe, as well as minimize problems experienced in the past. Baily changed the front suspension to Alan Mann specifications, which minimized nose-dive under braking. Zinc coated steel replaced the previous uncoated rust-prone sheet metal. The vulnerable drive donuts were replaced with CV joints and the leak-prone rubber gas tanks were replaced with aluminum tanks. The GT40 chassis was upgraded without making any major changes.

Tennant Panels supplied the roof structure and the balance of the chassis was completed by Safir. Bill Pink, noted for his electrical experience and the wiring installation of previous GT40s, was brought in. Also, Jim Rose was hired for his experience with working at both Alan Mann and Shelby. After the manufacture of chassis 1120, John Etheridge was hired to manage the GT40 build. The chassis was supplied from Adams McCall Engineering and parts supplied from Tennant panels.

For the most part, the Mk V resembled very closely the Mk I car, although there were a few changes, and, as with the '60s production, very few cars were identical.

The first car, GT40P-1090, had an open-top in place of roofed doors. Most motors were Ford small block, Webers or 4 Barrel Carburetor. Safir produced five Big Block GT40s, serial numbers GT40P-1128 to GT40P-1132. These aluminum big block cars all had easily removable door roof sections. Most GT40s were high-performance street cars however some of the Mk V production can be described as full race. Two road cars GT40P-1133 (roadster) and GT40P-1142 (roofed doors) were built as lightweights which included an aluminum honeycomb chassis and carbon fiber bodywork.

 Continuation models, replicas and modernizations 

Several kit cars and replicas inspired by the Ford GT40 have been built. They are generally intended for assembly in a home workshop or garage. There are two alternatives to the kit car approach, either continuation models (exact and licensed replicas true to the original GT40) or modernizations (replicas with upgraded components, ergonomics & trim for improved usability, drivability, and performance).

 GT40/R Competition, United States: Authentic GT40 built by Superformance and co-designed with Pathfinder Motorsports. This is the only GT40 continuation licensed by Safir GT40 Spares LLC, the holders of the GT40 trademark. A GT40/R (GT40P/2094) campaigned by Pathfinder Motorsports with an engine built by Holman Moody won both the 2009 US Vintage Grand Prix and the 2009 Governor's Cup at Watkins Glen.
 Southern GT: Built-in Swanmore, Southampton, UK. Specializing in GT40 Mk1 and Mk2, as well as Lola T70. Kit form or fully built to your specifications.
 CAV GT: Originally designed for customers to build as a kit, the CAV GT has evolved into a modernized replica that is now factory-built in Cape Town, South Africa.
 Holman Moody: GT40 Mark II won third at Le Mans in 1966, and can still manufacture a Holman GT from 1966 blueprints.
 GT40 Spyder, United States: Built by E.R.A. Replica Automobiles in New Britain, CT, the Spyder is a MK2 Canadian American (CAN-AM) racing replica. The ERA GT is "No Longer Available" according to their website (October 3, 2021).
 Ford GT40 By Everrati: The reborn Ferrari-beating supercar uses a 700-volt architecture, which allows for super-fast charging. Everrati estimates it delivers 800 horsepower (588 kilowatts) and 590 pound-feet (800 Newton-meters) of torque, making it almost twice more powerful than the most powerful version of the original GT40.

 Ford GT 

At the 1995 North American International Auto Show, the Ford GT90 concept was shown and at the 2002 show, a new GT40 Concept was unveiled by Ford.

While similar in appearance to the original cars, it was bigger, wider, and 3 inches (76 mm) taller than the original 40 inches (1020 mm). Three production prototype cars were shown in 2003 as part of Ford's centenary, and delivery of the production Ford GT began in the fall of 2004. The Ford GT was assembled in the Ford Wixom plant and painted by Saleen, Incorporated at their Saleen Special Vehicles plant in Troy, Michigan.

A British company, Safir Engineering, who continued to produce a limited number of GT40s (the Mk V) in the 1980s under an agreement with Walter Hayes of Ford and John Wilmont of J.W. Automotive Engineering, owned the GT40 trademark at that time, and when they completed production, they sold the excess parts, tooling, design, and trademark to a small American company called Safir GT40 Spares, Limited based in Ohio. Safir GT40 Spares licensed the use of the GT40 trademark to Ford for the initial 2002 show car, but when Ford decided to make the production vehicle, negotiations between the two failed, and as a result, the new Ford GT does not wear the badge GT40. Bob Wood, one of three partners who own Safir GT40 Spares, said: "When we talked with Ford, they asked what we wanted. We said that Ford owns Beanstalk in New York, the company that licenses the Blue Oval for Ford on such things as T-shirts. Since Beanstalk gets 7.5 percent of the retail cost of the item for licensing the name, we suggested 7.5 percent on each GT40 sold." In this instance, Ford wished to purchase, not just license the GT40 trademark. At the then-estimated $125,000 per copy, 7.5% of 4,500 vehicles would have totalled approximately $42,187,500. It was widely and erroneously reported following an Automotive News Weekly story that Safir "demanded" the $40 million for the sale of the trademark. Discussions between Safir and Ford ensued. However, in fact, the Ford Motor Company never made an offer in writing to purchase the famed GT40 trademark. Later models or prototypes have also been called the Ford GT but have had different numbering on them such as the Ford GT90 or the Ford GT70. The GT40 name and trademark is currently licensed to Superformance in the USA.

A second-generation Ford GT was unveiled at the 2015 North American International Auto Show. It features a 3.5L twin-turbocharged V6 engine, carbon fiber monocoque and body panels, pushrod suspension and active aerodynamics. It entered the 2016 season of the FIA World Endurance Championship and the United SportsCar Championship, and started being sold in a street-legal version at Ford dealerships in 2017.

 Television & movies 

A right-hand drive, silver GT40 is used by the villain in The Avengers, Season 5, Episode 1, "From Venus with Love". Mrs. Peal gets in and raises the laser installed in the roof. The car is used to simulate a UFO from Venus being used to kill astronomers. IMDB Avengers 5:1

 See also 
 Ford Supervan, a van-bodied variant
 Bundle of Snakes, characteristic exhaust system
 Colotti Trasmissioni, transmission of the initial, and early models
 AC Cobra, a car of similar Anglo-American parentage
 Ford v Ferrari, 2019 film about the GT40's development

 References 

 Further reading 
 "17 Ford GT40s Stampede into Pebble Beach! We Dive into Their Histories" (with historic and modern photo gallery), by Don Sherman, Car and Driver, August 2016.
 "An American Challenge" , Ford press release, 1966.
 Auto Passion n°49 July 1991 (in French)
 La Revue de l'Automobile Historique n°7 March/April 2001 (in French)
 Ford: The Dust and the Glory/A motor racing history by Leo Levine/1968
 Ford vs. Ferrari: the Battle for Le Mans by Anthony Pritchard, 1984 Zuma Marketing
 Ford GT-40: An Individual History and Race Record by Ronnie Spain 1986
 Go Like Hell: Ford, Ferrari, and Their Battle for Speed and Glory at Le Mans by A. J. Baime
 12 Hours of Sebring 1965 by Harry Hurst and Dave Friedman
 Ford GT40 Manual: An Insight into Owning, Racing and Maintaining Ford's Legendary Sports Racing Car''(Haynes Owners' Workshop Manuals) by Gordon Bruce

GT40
GT40
Rear mid-engine, rear-wheel-drive vehicles
Sports cars
Group 4 (racing) cars
Group 6 (racing) cars
Cars introduced in 1965
Retro-style automobiles
24 Hours of Le Mans race cars
Le Mans winning cars
Cars of England